The 1930 Delaware Fightin' Blue Hens football team was an American football team that represented the University of Delaware in the 1930 college football season. In its second and final season under head coach Gus Ziegler, the team compiled a 6–3–1 record and outscored opponents by a total of 138 to 117.

Schedule

References

Delaware
Delaware Fightin' Blue Hens football seasons
Delaware Fightin' Blue Hens football